Belle Alliance was the first large ship built in Guernsey. Barry Patourel built her at Glategny for J.Vidamour. The ship was lost on 8 March 1823 on the Goodwin Sands, Kent. Her crew were rescued. She was on a voyage from Antwerp to Guernsey.

Citations and references
Citations

References
 

1815 ships
Maritime incidents in March 1823